GQ Group of Companies is a Bangladeshi diversified conglomerate based in Dhaka. Salma Huq is the chairperson and Abu Hasan Khan is the managing director of the Group.

History 
GQ Group of Companies was established in 1981 by Qazi Saleemul Huq and Salma Huq as a manufacturer of ball pens under the Econo brand.

GQ Ball Pen was listed on the Dhaka Stock Exchange in 1986.

GQ Group of Companies founded GQ Foods Limited in 1992, selling chips under Krispy Curl and krispy brand.

GQ Industries Limited was founded in 1994 as a manufacturer of woven sacks. Maladesh International (Private) Limited was founded in 1994 as a joint collaboration with a Malaysian company to produce King brand coils. Qazi Saleemul was elected to parliament in 1994 from Magura-2 in a controversial by-election as a Bangladesh Nationalist Party candidate.

GQBPIL founded in 1996 specializes in the manufacture of recyclable and biodegradable plastic products.

Saleemul was re-elected to parliament in 2001 from Magura-2. He retired from Bangladesh Nationalist Party in 2016 and is an accused in the  Zia Charitable Trust corruption case.

On 21 April 2017, a GQ Ballpen and Plastic Limited factory in Savar burned down in an electric fire.

In November 2018, the sponsor directors of GQ BAll pen own 41.88 percent of its shares. In 2018 the company suffered major declines in the stock market.

In February 2020, Bangladesh Securities and Exchange Commission formed a two member investigation team to look into the sudden rise in price of GQ Ball Pen shares on the Dhaka Stock Exchange. The share price of the companies continued to rise into 2021 and becoming a top gainer on the Dhaka Stock Exchange. Share prices declined in June 2021.

Businesses 

 GQ Ball Pen Industries Limited
 GQ Foods Limited
 GQ Industries Limited
 GQBPIL
 GQ Enterprise Limited
 Maladesh International (Private) Limited
 GQ Enterprise Limited
 GQ Marketing Limited

References 

1981 establishments in Bangladesh
Organisations based in Dhaka
Conglomerate companies of Bangladesh